National Council elections were held in the Czech part of Czechoslovakia on 5 and 6 June 1981.

Results

Seats by sex
144 Male
56 Female

External links
Mandate and Immunity Committee Message (Czech)
Election Results (Czech)

Czech
Legislative elections in Czechoslovakia
Elections to the Chamber of Deputies of the Czech Republic
Single-candidate elections
Czech